"No Bullshit", also stylized as "No BS" is a song by American recording artist Chris Brown, released as the second single from his second official mixtape Fan of a Fan (2010). The song was originally recorded for and included on Brown's previous mixtape In My Zone (2010), and was later included on his fourth studio album F.A.M.E. (2011). Musically, the song is about Brown encouraging a woman to come back to his apartment in the hope that she will "do it all night". It was written by Brown, Kevin McCall and Tha Bizness.

The song peaked at number three on the US Billboard Hot R&B/Hip-Hop Songs, number one on urban radio, and number 62 on the US Billboard Hot 100.

Music video 
The music video for "No Bullshit" was directed by Colin Tilley and premiered online on May 24, 2010 along with the video for "Deuces". In the video, Brown is seen wooing and romancing his leading lady. It shows them kissing, licking, and touching on display in the shower, living room, and bedroom. During the video Brown is also seen dancing on a rooftop in a black outfit. The girl in the video is wearing all black.

Critical reception
AllMusic editor Andy Kellman was positive about the song: "then there was the smoothly percussive "No BS", a slow jam with chivalrous sweet nothings like "I’m-a leave it in when we do it" and "Don’t you be on that bullshit" but he noted that this isn't the album's best. The A.V. Club's Evan Rytlewsky described the song as an "after-dark fare." Entertainment Weekly wrote an impressed opinion stating that it leads to intoxicating hooks, calling it a "bedroom knocker" and continued: "which for better (or worse), rivals the bump-'n'-grind heights of '90s Casanova crew Jodeci." David Amidon of PopMatters wrote a mixed review: "But then there are the songs like "No Bullshit" he'll no doubt be expected to slow his sets with. The "no bullshit" is his ability to make love for an entire night, of course. He'd also prefer that you "don’t be on that bullshit" as far as disbelieving him is concerned."

Chart performance
Initially only released as a B-side to Brown's previous single "Deuces", the song was later released to rhythmic radio on January 18, 2011 as a single in its own right. The song peaked at number 62 on the US Billboard Hot 100 chart and number three on the US Hot R&B/Hip-Hop Songs chart.

Credits and personnel 
Christopher Brown - songwriter, lead vocals
Kevin McCall (K-Mac) - song writer
Christopher Whitacre - songwriter, producer
Justin Henderson - songwriter, producer
Brian Springler - audio mixing
Ghazi Hourani - assistant audio mixing

Charts

Year-end charts

Certifications

References

2010 singles
2010 songs
Chris Brown songs
Tyga songs
Songs written by Kevin McCall
Songs written by Chris Brown
Song recordings produced by Tha Bizness
Music videos directed by Colin Tilley
2010s ballads
Contemporary R&B ballads